Highway H15 is a Ukrainian national highway (H-highway) connecting Zaporizhzhia with Donetsk.  It passes through Vil'nians'k, Mykhailo-Lukasheve, and Kolos in Vilniansk Raion, Rodyns'ke, Petropavlivka, Novomykolaivka in Novomykolaivka Raion; Kyivs'ke and Trudove in Bilmak Raion; Novokasyanivka in Novomykolaivka Raion; Zelena Dolyna, Pysantsi, Mechetne, Orly, Dibrova, and Havrylivke in Synelnykove Raion; Iskra, Piddubne-Tolstoi, Perebudova-Komar, Ordradne, Bahatyr, Kostayantynopil', Andriivka, and Ulakly in Velyka Novosilka Raion; Dachne in Marinka Raion; Kurakhove, and Maksymil'yanivka-Heorhiivka-Marinka. The H15 has a brief concurrency with highway T-04-01 in Synelnykove Raion.

War in Donbas
Significant armed conflict has occurred along and near the H15 during the Russo-Ukrainian War.

Main route

Main route and connections to/intersections with other highways in Ukraine.

See also

 Roads in Ukraine

References

External links
National Roads in Ukraine in Russian

Roads in Zaporizhzhia Oblast
Roads in Dnipropetrovsk Oblast
Roads in Donetsk Oblast